Moshé Mizrahi (5 September 1931 – 3 August 2018) was an Israeli film director.

Biography
He was born in Egypt, migrated to Mandatory Palestine in 1946, and studied filmmaking in France in 1950. He directed the Oscar-winning 1977 film Madame Rosa starring Simone Signoret. The film, which was about a former prostitute in Paris who survived Auschwitz, won the Academy Award for Best Foreign Language Film on behalf of France.

He directed 14 films in both Israel and France, three of which were nominated for the Academy Award for Best Foreign Language Film; I Love You Rosa, The House on Chelouche Street and Madame Rosa, with the last of these winning the award.

In September 1994, he was honored by the Haifa Film Festival for his lifetime contribution to Israeli cinema.

His landmark film Les Stances à Sophie went practically unseen until it was re-released in 2008 and its jazz soundtrack album of the same name (but lacking the accent) was profiled in The FADER by Alexander Geoffrey Frank.

As of March 2009, Mizrahi was living in Tel Aviv, leading film-making workshop in Tel Aviv University's film school. His wife, Michal Bat-Adam, is a film director as well as an actress and played lead roles in several of Mizrahi's films. Today, she teaches acting classes at Tel Aviv University.

He died of pneumonia on 3 August 2018, at the age of 86.

Partial filmography
Les Stances à Sophie (Sophie's Ways, 1970)
The Customer of the Off Season (1970)
I Love You Rosa (Ani Ohev Otach Rosa, 1972)
Daughters, Daughters (1973)
The House on Chelouche Street (1973)
Rachel's Man (1975)
Madame Rosa (La Vie devant soi, 1977)
Une jeunesse, based upon the novel of the same title by Patrick Modiano
 (I Sent a Letter to my Love) (1980)
Every Time We Say Goodbye (1986)

References

External links

1931 births
2018 deaths
People from Alexandria
Israeli Jews
Israeli film directors
Egyptian emigrants to Israel
Israeli people of Egyptian-Jewish descent
Egyptian Jews
Directors of Best Foreign Language Film Academy Award winners
Deaths from pneumonia in Israel